The 2003 Tampa Bay Devil Rays season was their sixth since the franchise was created. This season, they finished last in the AL East division with a record of 63–99. Their manager was Lou Piniella who entered his first season with the Devil Rays.

Regular season

Season standings

Record vs. opponents

Transactions
February 14, 2003: Wayne Gomes was signed as a free agent with the Tampa Bay Devil Rays.
March 10, 2003: Wayne Gomes was released by the Tampa Bay Devil Rays.
March 29, 2003: Al Martin was signed as a free agent with the Tampa Bay Devil Rays.
April 10, 2003: John Rocker signed as a free agent with the Tampa Bay Devil Rays.
June 27, 2003: John Rocker was released by the Tampa Bay Devil Rays.

Draft picks
June 3, 2003: Delmon Young was drafted by the Tampa Bay Devil Rays in the 1st round (1st pick) of the 2003 amateur draft. Player signed September 8, 2003.
June 3, 2003: Josh Geer was drafted by the Tampa Bay Devil Rays in the 19th round of the 2003 amateur draft, but did not sign.

Roster

Player stats

Batting

Starters by position 
Note: Pos = Position; G = Games played; AB = At bats; H = Hits; Avg. = Batting average; HR = Home runs; RBI = Runs batted in

Other batters 
Note: G = Games played; AB = At bats; H = Hits; Avg. = Batting average; HR = Home runs; RBI = Runs batted in

Pitching

Starting pitchers 
Note: G = Games pitched; IP = Innings pitched; W = Wins; L = Losses; ERA = Earned run average; SO = Strikeouts

Other pitchers 
Note: G = Games pitched; IP = Innings pitched; W = Wins; L = Losses; ERA = Earned run average; SO = Strikeouts

Relief pitchers 
Note: G = Games pitched; W = Wins; L = Losses; SV = Saves; ERA = Earned run average; SO = Strikeouts

Farm system

LEAGUE CHAMPIONS: Durham

References

2003 Tampa Bay Devil Rays at Baseball Reference
2003 Tampa Bay Devil Rays team page at www.baseball-almanac.com

Tampa Bay Devil Rays seasons
Tampa Bay Devil Rays season
Tampa Bay Devil Rays